My Very Best is a 2008 compilation album of songs by Agnetha Fältskog

Music

Albums
My Very Best, compilation album by Porter Wagoner 1990
My Very Best, compilation album by Frankie Yankovic
My Very Best, compilation album by Roch Voisine 2014
My Very Best, compilation album by Eileen Farrell 1994
My Very Best, Love Dusty, compilation album by Dusty Springfield

Songs
"My Very Best", song by Elbow from Leaders of the Free World 2005